Automatic Love may refer to:

"Automatic Love", song by Minipop
"Automatic Love", song by Die Form
"Automatic Love", song by Kristeen Young from Breasticles
"Automatic Love", song by Kylie Minogue from Kylie Minogue
"Automatic Love", song by Gore Gore Girls from Up All Night
"Automatic Love", song by Key Motion